Famasloop is a Latin Grammy-nominated electronic music band from Caracas, Venezuela. The band's members are Alain Gómez, Luis Daniel González, Ricardo Martínez, Rafael Urbina and Vanesa Gouveia. The group's first album, Tres Casas, which was released in June 2006, experimented with electronic music to integrate several genres such as pop, Latin, rock, hip-hop, trip hop, Afro-Venezuelan, classical, Hindu, tango and jazz.

Tres Casas, which literally means Three Houses in Spanish, was released with a surrounding concept represented in the album's art and multimedia content, designed by the Venezuelan artist collective Keloide. Famasloop has described to the press that the album is divided into three houses, each one with a different theme (commercial, intellectual and spiritual). All of these houses include a half-a-minute introductory Puerta (Spanish for door), and three songs, making a total of twelve tracks. The album received production and post-production guest contribution from well-known musicians, such as Tweety González (keyboardist of Fito Páez), Nené Vázquez (percussionist of Aterciopelados), Guille Vadalá (Bass guitarist of Fito Páez), Oswaldo Rodríguez (Sur Carabaela) and more.

Discography

Albums 
Tres Casas (2006)
Puerta 1
Estrella en Loop
Mundo
Eres
Puerta 2
Pararrayos
Lu Arbole
Cementerio
Puerta 3
Avión A
Mar
Iguana

Casa 4 (2009)
Iguana
Chinita
NQV
Te Juro
Chamo Pol La Casa
Al Revés
Cada
Cucaracha
De Fuego en Fuego
Vaca Lechera

La Quema (2012)
Luciérnaga
The Choro Dance
Por Estas Calles
Imaginar
Canuto y Canito
Más Cerquita
La Vaca Indefinida
Tonada del Niño Con Barba
Taima
Uno y El Universo

Lo Más Seguro Es Que Quién Sabe (2022)

 Nadie
 Canibal
 Dengue
 Resistencia
 Ombligo
 Goxcila (feat. DJ Yirvin)
 Balcón (feat. Luis Jiménez)
 Por Ti
 Gira

Singles and EP 

 Cómo Fue (feat, Betsayda Machado) (2020)
 No Pasa Nada (2015)
 Allí Estás (2014)
 Terrenal (2014)

External links

 Famasloop.com - Official website 
 Famasloop at MySpace
 Eres music video at YouTube
 El Universal newspaper interview 
Gira music video at YouTube

Venezuelan musical groups